

Regular Football League First team

Number of League games in which this eleven was fielded = 1

The Football League

Football Association Challenge Cup

Final league table

Sources

 http://www.evertonfc.com/stats/?mode=season&era_id=1&season_id=4&seasons=4 
 http://www.allfootballers.com

1891-92
English football clubs 1891–92 season